Diego Omar Dabove (born 18 January 1973) is an Argentine football manager and former player who played as a goalkeeper. He is the current manager of Huracán.

Playing career
Born in Banfield, Dabove was a Lanús youth graduate and was a part of the first team squad for one year. After leaving in 1994, he went on to resume his career in the lower leagues, representing Dock Sud, Argentino de Quilmes, Cañuelas, Ferro Carril Oeste de General Pico, Sporting Club de Laboulaye and Deportivo Riestra.

Dabove retired at the age of just 27 due to a shoulder injury.

Managerial career
Immediately after retiring, Dabove joined Miguel Ángel Russo's staff as a goalkeeping coach at Los Andes. He moved to former club Lanús in 2001, under the same role, and was also an interim manager of the main squad for one match in 2003.

After leaving Lanús in 2004, Dabove worked as a goalkeeping coach at Boca Juniors in 2004 before returning to Lanús in 2005. After a short period at Huracán, he worked under Néstor Gorosito at Rosario Central, Argentinos Juniors (two times), River Plate, Xerez, Independiente and Tigre.

On 8 July 2013, Dabove was appointed manager of Racing de Olavarría, but resigned on 15 October. He returned to his previous goalkeeping coach role in the following year at Racing Club, before being named under the same role at the Bahrain national team.

After leaving Bahrein in June 2016, Dabove was named goalkeeping coach of Sarmiento de Junín before taking the same role Arsenal de Sarandí at the end of the year. In 2017, he was named coach of the youth categories of Godoy Cruz.

On 13 December 2017, Dabove was appointed manager of Godoy Cruz's main squad, replacing Mauricio Larriera. On 8 December of the following year, after qualifying the club to the 2019 Copa Libertadores, he left the club after his contract was due to expire, and took over Argentinos Juniors five days later.

Dabove resigned from Argentinos on 12 January 2021, and was named manager of San Lorenzo seven days later. On 10 May, after the latter's elimination from the 2021 Copa de la Liga Profesional, he asked to leave.

On 18 August 2021, Dabove was appointed manager of Campeonato Brasileiro Série A side Bahia, being the club's eighth foreign manager (fourth Argentine) and the first foreigner since 1979. He was sacked on 6 October, after being in charge for only six matches.

Managerial statistics

References

External links

1973 births
Living people
Argentine footballers
Association football goalkeepers
Club Atlético Lanús footballers
Sportivo Dock Sud players
Cañuelas footballers
Deportivo Riestra players
Argentine football managers
Argentine Primera División managers
Campeonato Brasileiro Série A managers
Club Atlético Lanús managers
Godoy Cruz Antonio Tomba managers
Argentinos Juniors managers
San Lorenzo de Almagro managers
Esporte Clube Bahia managers
Club Atlético Banfield managers
Club Atlético Huracán managers
Argentine expatriate football managers
Argentine expatriate sportspeople in Brazil
Expatriate football managers in Brazil
People from Banfield, Buenos Aires
Sportspeople from Buenos Aires Province